Harrison Township was a township in Greeley County, Kansas, USA.  As of the 2000 census, its population of the former township was 107.

Geography
According to the USGS, it contains one cemetery, Greely County.

Greeley County was previously divided into three townships.  However, in 1992, Colony Township and Harrison Township were merged into Tribune Township, leaving only one township for the county.  This was not reported to the U.S. census until 2006, thus the 2000 census did not reflect the merger, but the 2010 census did.

Transportation
Harrison Township contained one airport or landing strip, Tribune Municipal Airport.

References

 USGS Geographic Names Information System (GNIS)

External links
 US-Counties.com
 City-Data.com

Townships in Greeley County, Kansas
Townships in Kansas